The 1993 British Grand Prix was a Formula One motor race held at Silverstone on 11 July 1993. It was the ninth race of the 1993 Formula One World Championship.

The 59-lap race was won from pole position by Alain Prost, driving a Williams-Renault. It was Prost's sixth victory of the season and the 50th of his Formula One career. Michael Schumacher finished second in a Benetton-Ford, with teammate Riccardo Patrese third.

This was the second race of 1993 to be held in Britain, after the European Grand Prix at Donington Park three months earlier.

Report
With Nigel Mansell now racing Indycars in America, British racing fans had taken Damon Hill to their hearts. Williams took 1–2 in qualifying with Prost on pole ahead of Hill, Schumacher, Ayrton Senna, Patrese and Martin Brundle.

At the start, Hill took the lead from Prost, who was also passed by Senna. Michael Andretti in the other McLaren spun off at Copse on the first lap, while Hill pulled away at the front, and Senna held up both Prost and Schumacher. Prost finally passed Senna on lap 7 but Hill was already five seconds up the road. On lap 13, Schumacher passed Senna for third and pulled away as the order settled down.

Gradually Prost closed up on Hill, narrowing the gap to three seconds after the mid-race pit stops. Then, Luca Badoer crashed, bringing out the Safety Car and reducing the gap between Hill and Prost to nothing. The Safety Car came in on lap 40, before Hill's engine blew two laps later. Brundle's gearbox failed on lap 54 when he was fourth. Finally, on the last lap, Senna's car ran out of fuel. Prost took his 50th Grand Prix win ahead of Schumacher, Patrese, Johnny Herbert, Senna (who was classified fifth) and Derek Warwick.

Complimenting the Lotus team on Herbert's fourth-place finish, Murray Walker closed his broadcast with the words "Lotus are back!". As it turned out, the team only scored points once more.

Classification

Qualifying

Race

Championship standings after the race

Drivers' Championship standings

Constructors' Championship standings

References

British Grand Prix
British Grand Prix
Grand Prix
British Grand Prix